Gudrun Beckmann (born 17 August 1955 in Düsseldorf) is a German former swimmer who competed in the 1972 Summer Olympics and in the 1976 Summer Olympics.

References

1955 births
Living people
German female swimmers
German female freestyle swimmers
German female butterfly swimmers
Olympic swimmers of West Germany
Swimmers at the 1972 Summer Olympics
Swimmers at the 1976 Summer Olympics
Olympic bronze medalists for West Germany
Olympic bronze medalists in swimming
Sportspeople from Düsseldorf
World Aquatics Championships medalists in swimming
Medalists at the 1972 Summer Olympics
Universiade medalists in swimming
Universiade silver medalists for West Germany
Medalists at the 1977 Summer Universiade
21st-century German women
20th-century German women